Kyivskyi District may refer to the following places in Ukraine:

Kyivskyi District, Donetsk
Kyivskyi District, Kharkiv
Kyivskyi District, Odessa
Kyivskyi District, Poltava
Kyivskyi District, Simferopol